Carolyn Hovde Bohach is an American food scientist, currently University Distinguished Professor at Washington State University.

Her research has focused on enterohemorrhagic Escherichia coli  which include the infamous O157:H7 serotype.

Early life and education
Bohach received bachelor of science at the University of Illinois in 1975, a medical technologist (MT) certification from the American Society for Clinical Pathology (ASCP) while at the Swedish Medical Center in 1976 and a doctorate at the University of Minnesota in 1985.

References

Year of birth missing (living people)
Living people
Washington State University faculty
American food scientists
University of Minnesota alumni
University of Illinois Urbana-Champaign alumni
Scientists from Washington (state)